The Pirates of Somalia (or simply Pirates of Somalia in the UK) is a 2017 American drama film written and directed by Bryan Buckley, and based on the 2011 book of the same name. The film stars Evan Peters, Al Pacino, Melanie Griffith, and Barkhad Abdi. The film had its world premiere at the Tribeca Film Festival on April 27, 2017. The film was released on December 8, 2017, by Echo Bridge.

Plot
After his graduation from the University of Toronto, journalist Jay Bahadur in vain tries to gain a foothold in the profession. Still living with his parents, he keeps himself afloat with unsatisfactory activity as a questioner for product placing in supermarkets. A chance appears when his journalistic idol Seymour Tolbin inspires him to realize his dream of journalism not in a conventional way through a post-graduate university education, but through an exciting mission to investigate the backgrounds of piracy in Somalia.

Bahadur secures support from local people and flies to the civil war-torn country. Through his translator Abdi, he manages to establish contacts with the local Somali pirates and to interview them. He gets increasingly interested in studying an organization of Somali pirates. In order to fulfill this dream, Bahadur continues his investigation, finding himself more and more in danger, and is eventually carried along by the maelstrom of events.

Cast
Evan Peters as Jay Bahadur
Al Pacino as Seymour Tolbin
Melanie Griffith as Maria Bahadur
Barkhad Abdi as Abdi
Aidan Whytock as Agent Brice 
Kiana Madani as Tracy Ziconni 
Philip Ettinger as Alex
Darron Meyer as Mitch Kelp 
Russell Posner as Jared Bahadur 
Armaan Haggio as Mohamad Farole Jr. 
Jojo Gonzalez as Jojo
Maria Vos as Avril Benoît 
Sabrina Hassan as Maryan 
Mohamed Barre as Boyah
Abdi Sidow Farah as Colonel Omar

Production
On October 20, 2015, it was announced Bryan Buckley would direct the film, with Evan Peters joining the cast. On February 11, 2016, Al Pacino, Melanie Griffith and Barkhad Abdi joined the cast of the film. Principal photography began in February 2016, and ended on April 24, 2016.

Release and reception
The film had its world premiere at the Tribeca Film Festival on April 27, 2017. Shortly after, Echo Bridge acquired U.S. distribution rights to the film, and set it for a December 8, 2017, release.

The film received generally mixed reviews. It currently holds a 67% rating on Rotten Tomatoes and a 54% rating on Metacritic.

References

External links
 
 

2017 films
2017 drama films
American drama films
Pirate films
2010s English-language films
2010s American films